Acraga conda is a moth in the family Dalceridae. It was described by Harrison Gray Dyar Jr. in 1911. It is found in the Guianas.

Adults are similar to Acraga ochracea, but have a somewhat more diversified ground colour, the orange seeming to be overspread upon a yellow ground and more intense on the inner margin.

Taxonomy
Acraga conda is part of the Acraga infusa species complex.

References

Moths described in 1911
Dalceridae